Arthur Froehlich (May 17, 1909 – October 3, 1985), of the firm Arthur Froehlich & Associates, was an architect in Beverly Hills, California, known for his mid-century commercial building designs, especially racetracks. Froehlich's firm designed Hollywood Park Racetrack in Inglewood, California; Keeneland in Lexington, Kentucky; and Aqueduct Racetrack and Belmont Park, both in New York. He also designed tracks in Canada, New Zealand, South Africa, Panama, France and Trinidad. One of his most lavish designs was for Hipódromo Nacional at Caracas, Venezuela (A.K.A. La Rinconada Hippodrome) in 1959. Sports Illustrated wrote that year that his creations were as "bright and gay as a state fair." The magazine described them as colorful, spacious, and glamorous. The tracks were filled with art and lush landscaping and provided a comfortable and relaxing environment in which to gamble. Froehlich noted that a good racetrack design has to be "as efficient as a bank, as careful in its community relations as a department store and as comfortable as a public park." The output of Froehlich's firm ranged from the mundane (a parking structure at UCLA), to the fantastic: the animation studio for Hanna-Barbera in Hollywood. In between, the firm designed White Memorial Medical Center, the headquarters building for Merle Norman Cosmetics, in Westchester, The Screen Directors Guild in Hollywood, Francisco Sepulveda Middle School in North Hills.
Froehlich renamed his firm Froehlich & Kow in 1978, after appointing architect Morio Kow as a partner and Gordon Gong as associate in charge of special projects.

Froehlich was born in Los Angeles to a cattle and dairy farmer. He attended Polytechnic High School in Los Angeles and studied at UCLA. One of his first jobs was drafting plans for Santa Anita racetrack, which opened in 1934. He began his own firm in 1938, and became well known for his design of Hollywood Park Racetrack in Inglewood, California.

Buildings credited to Arthur Froehlich & Associates:
 Hollywood Park Racetrack, 1938, Los Angeles, California.
 Garden State Park Racetrack Grandstand/Clubhouse, Cherry Hill, New Jersey (Built 1941–1942, destroyed by fire April, 1977)
 Jack Rose Building, 1948, Ventura, California. (Demolished 1997) This building was one of the finest examples of streamlined Moderne architecture in the city of Ventura.
  Wagon Wheel Bowling Alley, 1953, Wagon Wheel Junction, Oxnard, California.
 University of California, Riverside Physical Education building, 1953, Riverside, California.
 Lynwood City Hall, 1954, Lynwood, California.
 Screen Directors Guild, 1955, Los Angeles, California.
 Roosevelt Raceway, 1957,  Roosevelt Field, New York.
 Aqueduct Racetrack, 1958, Ozone Park, New York.
 Hipodromo La Rinconada, 1959, racetrack, Caracas, Venezuela.
  Kingpin Lanes, 1960, 3415 Sepulveda Blvd. Los Angeles, California.
 Hanna Barbera Studio office building, 1962, 3400 Cahuenga Boulevard, Los Angeles, California.
 Belmont Park, 1967 racetrack, Elmont, New York.
 Expansion and remodel of the US Post Office, 1964, Downtown, Ventura, California.
 Center 3 Theater, 1965, San Diego, California.
 Los Verdes Golf Course Clubhouse, 1965, Rancho Palos Verdes, CA.

References

External links
 CinemaTreasures.org, Center 3 Theaters, San Diego, CA.

1909 births
1985 deaths
People from Beverly Hills, California
20th-century American architects